Six Flags Entertainment Corporation, formerly Six Flags Theme Park, Inc., is an American amusement park corporation, headquartered in Arlington, Texas. It has properties in Canada, Mexico, and the United States. Six Flags owns the most theme parks and waterparks combined of any amusement-park company and has the seventh highest attendance in the world. The company operates 27 properties throughout North America, including theme parks, amusement parks, water parks, and a family entertainment center. In 2019, Six Flags properties hosted 32.8 million guests.

Originally, the company was known as Six Flags, Corp., and later Six Flags, Inc. Founded in the 1960's, its name is derived from its first property, Six Flags Over Texas. The company maintains a corporate office in Midtown Manhattan, and headquarters in Arlington, Texas. On June 13, 2009, the corporation filed for Chapter 11 bankruptcy protection because of crippling debt, which it successfully exited after corporate restructuring on May 3, 2010.

History

Origin 

The name "Six Flags" originally referred to the flags of the six different nations that have governed Texas: Spain, France, Mexico, the Republic of Texas, the United States of America, and the Confederate States of America. Six Flags parks are still divided into different themed sections, although many of the original areas from the first three parks have been replaced.

Six Flags Theme Parks originated in 1957 with the creation of The Great Southwest Corporation by Angus G. Wynne and other investors. Construction of Six Flags Over Texas started in 1960 and the park opened the next year for a short (45-day) season. The park initially featured a Native American village, a gondola ride, a railroad, some Wild West shows, a stagecoach ride and "Skull Island", a pirate-themed adventure attraction. There was also an excursion, inspired by the historical La Salle Expeditions in the late 1600s, called "LaSalle's River Adventure", aboard French riverboats through a wilderness full of animated puppets. Over the years, all of those attractions, except the railroad, were replaced by others, such as roller coasters, swing rides, log flumes and shoot-the-chute rides, as well as an observation tower.

Growth and acquisitions 
In 1964, Toddie Lee Wynne announced he would be selling his stake in the Great Southwest Corporation, which he created with his nephew Angus G. Wynne Jr. The sale was expected to be around $6 million. The Pennsylvania Railroad purchased 500,000 shares of the Great Southwest Corporation, giving them a controlling interest in the company and the park.

The original Six Flags park, Six Flags Over Texas in Arlington (between Dallas and Fort Worth), was officially sold in 1966 to a subsidiary of the Pennsylvania Railroad, which was actively pursuing non-railroad investments in an effort to diversify its sources of income (in 1968, the Pennsylvania Railroad merged with the New York Central Railroad to form Penn Central Corp which was absorbed into Conrail in 1976). With the new owners came a more abundant supply of capital for geographic expansion and park additions. Six Flags opened Six Flags Over Georgia in 1967 and Six Flags Over Mid-America in 1971, which were the last two original parks constructed by the company.

Six Flags continued to grow by acquiring independent parks. Six Flags purchased AstroWorld in Houston, Texas, in 1975; Great Adventure in Jackson, New Jersey, in 1977; and Magic Mountain in Valencia, California, in 1979. These purchases were followed by Penn Central selling assets to Bally Manufacturing in 1982.

In 1984, the Great America theme park in Gurnee, Illinois, was acquired from the Marriott hotel chain.

Also in 1984, as a result of its acquisition of Great America, Six Flags acquired the rights to Time Warner/Warner Bros.' Looney Tunes animated characters for use in Six Flags properties. Bally surrendered control of the chain to Wesray Capital Corporation in a 1987 leveraged buyout. Time Warner quickly began to gain more leverage in the company, gaining a 19.5% stake in Six Flags in 1990 and then 50% in 1991, with the remaining shares of the company being split by Blackstone Group and Wertheim Schroder & Company. Time Warner purchased the remaining stake in Six Flags in 1993, changing the company's name from Six Flags Corp. to Six Flags Theme Parks, Inc. In 1995, in an effort to reduce its debt load, Time Warner sold 51% of Six Flags for $200 million in cash to an investment group led by Boston Ventures, shifting $800 million in debt to Six Flags.

In 1996, Six Flags began to manage Fiesta Texas theme park in San Antonio, Texas, with a ten-year option to buy, and purchased the park (as Premier) from USAA in 1998.

History of Premier Parks 

Premier Parks originally operated as the Tierco Group, Inc., an Oklahoma-based real estate company. The company purchased the Frontier City theme park in Oklahoma City in 1982 for $1.2 million, although Tierco had no intention of entering the amusement park business. Company officials described Frontier City as "beat up" and "run down"; they planned to demolish it, subdivide the land and build a shopping center. However, given an oil bust in Oklahoma, developers lost interest in converting the park into a shopping center. In 1984, Tierco hired Gary Story as general manager of Frontier City and invested about $13 million into improving the park. As the new head of Frontier City, he quadrupled the park's attendance and revenues. Under his leadership, two rides, a ticket booth, sales office, and a petting zoo were added to the park. Food service improved.

In 1988, Tierco shifted its strategic direction to amusement parks. It sold much of its property in the late 1980s, generating capital to reinvest in Frontier City. As this reinvestment paid off, more capital became available, creating further growth. By 1991, Tierco opened White Water waterpark in Oklahoma City (the name later became Six Flags Hurricane Harbor Oklahoma City). The company realized the key to boosting a park's attendance was to add new and exciting rides and make it family-friendly.

Tierco acquired the financially troubled Wild World in Largo, Maryland, in 1992 and later changed that park's name to Adventure World. With a $500,000 investment, Tierco expanded Wild World's kiddie section and remodeled its buildings to give the park a tropical look and feel. Story was promoted to executive vice president after the purchase of Wild World. In 1994, he was promoted again to president and chief operating officer (COO). More flat rides and two roller coasters were added to that park.

Since Tierco was on its way to becoming a "premier" regional theme park operator, in 1994 it changed its name to Premier Parks, Inc. Kieran E. Burke, chairman and chief executive officer (CEO), noted that the new name signified the beginning of a new era for the company.

In the second half of the 1990s, Premier picked up speed. In 1995, the company acquired these Funtime, Inc. properties: Geauga Lake near Cleveland, Ohio, Wyandot Lake in Powell, Ohio and Darien Lake near Buffalo, New York. In 1996, Premier added to its portfolio, buying Elitch Gardens in Denver, Colorado, the Waterworld USA waterparks in Sacramento and Concord, California, Riverside Park in Agawam, Massachusetts, and Great Escape and Splashwater Kingdom in Queensbury, New York.

Geauga Lake, Wyandot Lake and Adventure World included water parks, while Frontier City was 14.8 miles away from White Water Bay that required separate admission. Riverside added one just before being sold. Premier Parks, in 1995 and 1996, added water parks to Darien Lake, Lake Compounce (immediately before the Kennywood sale), Elitch Gardens, and Great Escape.

Premier went public in 1996 and raised nearly $70 million through an initial offering at $18 per share. The company planned to use the money to expand its ten parks and acquire others. On September 26, 1997, Premier announced that they would purchase Kentucky Kingdom in Louisville for $64 million, the deal finalized on November 7. Also that year, the company purchased Marine World near San Francisco. A second public offering, at $29 per share, raised an additional $2 million. In December 1997, Premier entered a definitive agreement to purchase a controlling 94 percent interest in Walibi Family Parks in Europe. The deal was finalized in March 1998 adding five Walibi Parks and Bellewaerde to the chain. In 1997, almost 11 million people visited parks owned by Premier.

Premier added amusement park rides and roller coasters to Marine World in 1998.

Acquisition of Six Flags by Premier Parks 

Premier Parks purchased Six Flags Theme Parks, Inc. from Time Warner on April 1, 1998, for $1.86 billion. Premier began to apply the Six Flags name to several smaller parks that the company had already owned: Darien Lake, Elitch Gardens, Kentucky Kingdom and Marine World. Adventure World was rebranded as Six Flags America.

In 1999, Premier Parks purchased Warner Bros. Movie World Germany and the yet-to-be-built Warner Bros. Movie World Madrid from Warner Bros. As part of the acquisition, Premier Parks had the opportunity to open more European theme parks with Warner Bros. Movie World branding. Warner Bros. Movie World on the Gold Coast, Australia was not part of the deal. The same transaction saw Premier Parks obtain exclusive rights for Warner Bros. licensing in Europe and Latin America, in addition to their existing rights for the United States and Canada. In March 1999, Premier Parks purchased Reino Aventura for an estimated $59 million.

In 2000, Premier Parks assumed the Six Flags Theme Parks, Inc. name and continued re-branding its parks, including Geauga Lake park into Six Flags Ohio and Riverside Park to Six Flags New England. The company also rebranded one of the recently acquired Walibi parks — Walibi Flevo as Six Flags Holland, and Mexico's Reino Aventura as Six Flags Mexico.

In 2001, Six Flags acquired the former SeaWorld Ohio from Anheuser-Busch, merged it with the adjacent Six Flags Ohio and re-branded the combined park as Six Flags Worlds of Adventure. The park was positioned to compete against northern Ohio's Cedar Point. In May 2001, Six Flags negotiated with the city of Montreal to operate La Ronde in Montreal, Quebec, Canada. Six Flags acquired the assets of the park and has a long-term contract to lease the land from the city. Walibi Wavre was rebranded as Six Flags Belgium.

In 2002, Six Flags acquired New Orleans' Jazzland amusement park from Alfa Smartparks for $22 million.

Asset sales and shareholder revolt 

In 2004, Six Flags began to close and sell properties in an effort to help alleviate the company's growing debt. On March 10, Six Flags sold its European parks, with the exception of the Movie World park in Madrid, Spain, to Star Parks, a division of Palamon Capital Partners. The Madrid park was sold to Time Warner and renamed "Parque Warner Madrid". In April, Six Flags determined that the investment required to keep Worlds of Adventure competitive with Cedar Point in Ohio would be too great, leading to that park being sold to Cedar Fair. All Looney Tunes and DC Comics character branding was removed upon sale to Cedar Fair, since the latter owns the licensing rights to neither franchise. These sales raised $345 million in an effort to relieve Six Flags' massive debt.

In 2005, Six Flags endured even more turmoil. Some of the company's largest investors, notably Bill Gates's Cascade Investments (which then owned about 11% of Six Flags) and Daniel Snyder's Red Zone, LLC (which owned 12%), demanded change. On August 17, 2005, Red Zone began a proxy battle to gain control of Six Flags' board of directors. On August 29, 2005, Six Flags New Orleans (which was acquired by Six Flags in 2002) was severely damaged by Hurricane Katrina, and has since sat abandoned.

On September 12, Six Flags Chief Executive Officer Kieran Burke announced that Six Flags AstroWorld would be closed and demolished at the end of the 2005 season. The company cited issues such as the park's performance, and parking issues involving the Houston Texans football team, Reliant Stadium, and the Houston Livestock Show and Rodeo, leveraged with the estimated value of the property which included the park. Company executives were expecting to receive upwards of $150 million for the real estate but ended up receiving $77 million when the bare property (which cost $20 million to clear) was sold to a development corporation in 2006.

On November 22, Red Zone announced it had gained control of the board. Kieran Burke was removed on December 14 and replaced by Mark Shapiro, former executive vice president of programming at ESPN. Six Flags then named former Representative Jack Kemp, entertainment mogul Harvey Weinstein and Michael Kassan, the former president of the Interpublic Group of Companies Incorporated, to their newly revamped board of directors.

Even with the new management team, the sell-off would continue into 2006. On January 27, Six Flags announced the sale of Frontier City and White Water Bay after the 2006 operating season. At the same time, Six Flags announced it would close corporate offices in Oklahoma City, moving its headquarters to New York City. Six Flags CEO Mark Shapiro said he expected the parks to continue operation after the sale, a lesson the company learned after its public relations debacle with the closure of AstroWorld. In June, Six Flags announced it was considering closing or selling up to six of its parks, including Elitch Gardens, Darien Lake, WaterWorld in Concord, California, Wild Waves and Enchanted Village in Federal Way, Washington, Splashtown in Houston, Texas and, most notably, Six Flags Magic Mountain. In addition, Six Flags announced the sale of Wyandot Lake in Powell, Ohio to the neighboring Columbus Zoo and Aquarium. Ultimately, Six Flags Magic Mountain was spared, with the remaining six parks sold on January 11, 2007, to CNL Lifestyle Properties for $312 million: $275 million cash and a note for $37 million.

Bankruptcy 
The company's cash flow had decreased by over $120 million annually during the Shapiro years. In October 2008, Six Flags was warned its stock value had fallen below the required minimums to remain listed on the New York Stock Exchange. With the financial crisis of 2007–2008 weighing both on consumer spending and the ability to access credit facilities, Six Flags was believed to be unable to make a payment to preferred stockholders due in August 2009. Management saw the business as a sound one, noting that attendance across the company's parks increased slightly in 2008 compared to 2007. Six Flags CEO Mark Shapiro said that the company's problem was the declining attendance and cash flow created by his new management initiatives. If not resolved, the company warned in its 2008 annual report that the situation might require a Chapter 11 bankruptcy filing, with Six Flags already retaining counsel should that occur. The company stated at the time that it expected business to continue as normal in the event of such a filing, although one analyst believed attendance at the company's parks would decrease by six percent, suggesting parents would be leery of letting their children ride a roller coaster operated by a bankrupt company. In April 2009, the New York Stock Exchange announced it would delist Six Flags' stock on April 20, a decision that the company did not intend to appeal. On June 1, 2009, Six Flags announced it would delay its $15 million debt payment further using a 30-day grace period. Less than two weeks later, on June 13, the firm filed for Chapter 11 bankruptcy protection, but issued a statement that the parks would continue to operate normally while the company restructured. On August 21, 2009, Six Flags' Chapter 11 restructuring plan was announced in which lenders would control 92% of the company in exchange for cancelling $1.13 billion in debt.

One component of the restructuring was negotiating a new lease agreement with the Kentucky State Fair Board, which owned much of the land and attractions for Six Flags Kentucky Kingdom. Six Flags had asked to forgo rent payments for the remaining nine years of its current lease agreement in exchange for profit-sharing from the park's operations. When it appeared that the offer had been rejected, Six Flags announced in February 2010 that it would not re-open the park. However, the Kentucky State Fair Board stated at the time that they were still open to negotiating a revised lease agreement.

On April 28, 2010, the company's bondholders reached an agreement on a reorganization plan. Junior note holders, including hedge funds Stark Investments and Pentwater Capital Management, assumed control of the company, while senior note holders were paid in cash. Despite objections from some parties who stood to gain nothing, the bankruptcy judge approved the plan on April 30, 2010. As part of the settlement, chairman of the board Dan Snyder was removed, while chief executive officer Mark Shapiro briefly remained in his post.

Emergence from bankruptcy 
Six Flags officially emerged from bankruptcy protection as Six Flags Entertainment Corp. on May 3, 2010, and announced plans to issue new stock on the New York Stock Exchange. Amid suspected disagreements regarding the future of the company with the board, Shapiro left the company and Al Weber, Jr. was brought in as interim president and CEO. The company announced that several corporate positions as well as the corporate headquarters would be relocated from New York City to Grand Prairie, Texas. The building that served as the new headquarters, was located in the Great Southwest Industrial District and was a converted warehouse that had been in use by Six Flags for office space as well as a corporate operations center. Six Flags kept a portion of the Midtown Manhattan office and currently maintains a presence in New York City at that same location.

2010–present 

Six Flags announced that Jim Reid-Anderson would replace Weber and become chairman, president and chief executive officer (CEO) on August 13, 2010. John Duffey also joined the company in 2010, taking the role of chief financial officer (CFO). As of October 1, 2012, Al Weber, Jr. had retired as chief operating officer (COO) with no immediate successor.

On April 10, 2014, Six Flags announced a strategic partnership with Meraas Leisure and Entertainment (now known as DXB Entertainments) to build a Six Flags-branded theme park in Dubai, reviving the project. On June 23, 2014, Six Flags also announced a strategic partnership with Riverside Investment Group to build multiple Six Flags-branded theme parks in China over the decade.

On February 18, 2016, Six Flags announced that Jim Reid-Anderson had been promoted as executive chairman and John M. Duffey succeeded him as president and CEO. On January 11, 2016, Six Flags announced Six Flags Zhejiang, then named Six Flags Haiyan, in China. On the same day, a website was created along with concept art for the property. A month later on February 2, 2016. Six Flags announced Six Flags Hurricane Harbor Oaxtepec. The water park, originally named Parque Acuatico Oaxtepec, is a 76-acre park located in Morelos that went bankrupt in 2011. On March 21, 2016, Six Flags announced a partnership with NaVi Entertainment to build a Six Flags-branded theme park and a Six Flags Hurricane Harbor-branded water park in Vietnam. On March 29, 2016, Six Flags announced the revival of its previously canceled Six Flags Dubai. As part of the second phase of the Dubai Parks and Resorts project in Jebel Ali, the park was expected to open in 2019. On July 20, 2016, Six Flags announced an agreement with Riverside Investment Group Co. Ltd. for the development of a second Six Flags-branded theme park in China together with a water park. The two parks will be located in Bishan District, a district of Chongqing.

On April 27, 2017, the company announced it would take over operations of Waterworld California in Concord, California, making it Six Flags' 20th property. On July 18, 2017, Six Flags announced that president and CEO John M. Duffey had retired from the company and Jim Reid-Anderson had re-assumed the roles of chairman, president and CEO.

On March 22, 2018, Six Flags and Riverside Group announced a partnership with Turner Asia Pacific to bring Tuzki and other Turner-owned IPs to its theme parks in China. On May 22, 2018, Six Flags announced the purchase of operating leases for five parks owned by EPR Properties. The parks are Darien Lake, Frontier City, Wet'n'Wild Phoenix, Wet'n'Wild SplashTown and White Water Bay. On October 9, 2018, Six Flags and Rockford Park District announced a lease agreement allowing Six Flags to operate Magic Waters Waterpark beginning Spring 2019. On October 24, 2018, Six Flags announced that the future of its Six Flags Dubai theme park was "uncertain" following losses at the company and its partner DXB Entertainments.

On April 24, 2019, DXB Entertainments canceled Six Flags Dubai, stating that the development and establishment of a Six Flags theme park was not in the best interest of the company or its shareholders. Plans were made to direct the available proceeds to enhance the existing theme parks of Motiongate and Bollywood Parks. On October 2, 2019, Reuters reported that Six Flags Entertainment Corporation had approached competitor Cedar Fair with an acquisition offer. Sources said that Cedar Fair was considering Six Flags' cash-and-stock offer, but there was no certainty that a deal would be reached. On October 4, 2019, Cedar Fair rejected Six Flags' offer to purchase. On October 24, 2019, Six Flags Entertainment Corporation announced that Jim Reid-Anderson would retire and Mike Spanos would be president and CEO of the company on November 18, 2019.

On January 10, 2020, Six Flags indicated that its projects in China have not progressed as expected and could be canceled due to debt problems with its partner Riverside Investment Group. In January 2020, Six Flags finalized plans to move its corporate headquarters to the Centerfield Office Building at Globe Life Park in Arlington, Texas. The offices were remodeled over the summer and Six Flags personnel moved in during the last few months of the year. On March 13, 2020, with only a few parks already opened for the 2020 season, Six Flags announced that all its properties would suspend operations due to the COVID-19 pandemic. During the closure, parks donated supplies and food to their local communities. 

As of August 2020, some Six Flags operations were still suspended. On May 13, Six Flags announced that when the parks reopen guests will be required to reserve their place online to enter the park, including purchasing their tickets to the park and parking. Six Flags Great Adventure opened its drive-through safari to the public on May 30. Frontier City became the first park of the company to reopen on June 5, with new health and safety protocols. Soon after Frontier City's announcement, several other parks in the company announced their reopening dates. Starting on February 19, 2021, Six Flags had started gradually re-opening their amusement parks to the public for the upcoming season due to reduced COVID-19 restrictions, and by May of that year, all parks had successfully re-opened to the public.

On March 22, 2021, Six Flags announced that Six Flags Great America's Hurricane Harbor park would be converted into a separate park, becoming Six Flags Hurricane Harbor Chicago. Since its opening in 2005, the park was a part of Great America, but in recent years had started charging a one-day ticket upgrade to access the park. The change into a separate park meant that Hurricane Harbor Chicago would become the 27th Six Flags park in the chain. On November 15, 2021, Six Flags Entertainment Corporation announced that Mike Spanos had stepped down and Selim Bassoul, the former chairman of the board, would become president and CEO of the company effective immediately. Ben Baldanza, a former airlines industry executive, was elected to replace Bassoul as the chairman of the board.

Marketing efforts

TV commercials 

In 2004, although DC Comics and Looney Tunes as well as Scooby-Doo still had a major presence at the parks, Six Flags began a new series of commercials for the parks. The commercials introduced a new mascot: "Mr. Six", a seemingly feeble old man in a tuxedo and red bow tie. In many of the commercials, Mr. Six would slowly exit a multi-colored bus, only to start frenetically dancing to the Vengaboys' "We Like to Party". The commercials were an immediate hit and Mr. Six almost instantly became the de facto mascot and his presence was felt for years after the character was retired. These ads have become widely parodied on the Internet, with faces from other Internet memes being superimposed over Mr. Six's face.

From 2008 to 2010, Six Flags' TV ads consisted of a "Fun-O-Meter" in which the beginning of the ad showed something boring or embarrassing and a man's face judges it "One Flag!" or sometimes "Oh! Two Flags!". Then roller coasters and attractions of Six Flags are shown and says "Six Flags! More Flags, More Fun!" for Six Flags parks. However, the thick accent of the Asian man in the original commercials had drawn criticism for being an offensive caricature. In 2009, the Mr. Six character came back from retirement and replaced the Asian man in Six Flags' ads, still using the Fun-O-Meter. In 2011, Six Flags' TV ads got a brand-new slogan "Go Big! Go Six Flags!" for its theme parks.

As part of Six Flags' effort to reopen theme parks in 2021 following the COVID-19 pandemic, Six Flags brought in a new slogan for both its social media and TV ads, "The Thrill is Calling".

Licensing with other brands and companies 
Six Flags has licensed its name and its theme park creations to other companies, who have used these assets to create licensed products. One notable example is the theme park simulation game Roller Coaster Tycoon 2, which featured recreations of Six Flags parks and rides that could be expanded and operated at the player's discretion.

Six Flags has approximately 24 known current and past partners. These partners include Dole, Armitron, Mike and Ike, Barcel, Good Humor, Nathan's Famous, Coca-Cola, Icee, Ortega, Cold Stone Creamery, J&J Snack Foods, Red Gold, Coppertone, Johnny Rockets, Samsung, Dasani, Mars and Tyson Foods. These businesses help the park generate more income. Most importantly it provides more jobs for prospective employees. For example, Barcel USA expanded its partnership in 2013. This helps to import food and beverages to increase sponsorships within the United States.

In 2008, Six Flags partnered with Brash Entertainment to create a video game based on the Six Flags parks named Six Flags Fun Park. The game was first released on the Nintendo DS on October 28, 2008. The Wii version was delayed while the PC and PlayStation 2 versions were canceled after Brash Entertainment went out of business. On February 24, 2009, the rights to the Wii version were taken over by Ubisoft, who released it on March 3, 2009. The game allows players to explore the themed areas and mini-games representative of a visit to a Six Flags park. In the game, players are tasked with quests that encourage them to explore the park's universe. After creating a unique custom character, Six Flags Fun Park patrons can win prizes and compete with other players in 40 mini-games. Although the video game is called Six Flags Fun Park, it lacks any major reference of Six Flags outside of the names of the different areas. This caused some to speculate that the video game was created separately, then the rights to the name of the game were sold as a way to pay for the game's development. When the game was released, it eventually ended up getting abysmal ratings across the board. IGN gave the Wii version a 4.5 out of 10, saying "The quests are uninteresting and the game's '40 Thrilling Games' (as touted by the box) are far from entertaining."

In late 2010, Six Flags began the process of removing non-Warner Bros. licensed theming from attractions. They terminated licenses with Thomas the Tank Engine, The Wiggles, Tony Hawk, Evel Knievel, and Terminator. However, since then there has been an expansion of licensing agreements with Warner Bros., with whom the company has had a long-standing relationship. The expansion lies specifically with Warner Bros.' DC Comics brand, where the two teamed up to create Justice League: Battle for Metropolis as well as many other roller coasters and other rides.

On May 18, 2017, Six Flags and Riverside Group signed an agreement with Paws, Inc. to use Garfield in children's areas in Six Flags-branded theme parks in China.

Other assets 
On June 19, 2007, Six Flags announced it had purchased 40% of Dick Clark Productions, which owns rights to American Bandstand and other shows and productions.

In 2012, Jim Reid-Anderson stated that the company would sell its stake in Dick Clark Productions.

Current properties

Amusement parks

Water parks

Outdoor

Located in amusement parks

Separate admission/property

Indoor

Upcoming properties

Amusement parks

Former and abandoned properties 
These properties are listed in alphabetical order by the final name of the park while under Six Flags control.

North America

Europe
All these categorised parks were all sold to StarParks in 2004, unless noted.

Cancelled parks

The Flash Pass

The Flash Pass is an optional, pay-per-person virtual queue system offered at Six Flags amusement parks. The system, named after DC Comics character The Flash, allows guests to reserve places in line at participating attractions, and access must be purchased for a nominal fee in addition to the general park admission price. The first iteration, called Q-bot, was designed by Lo-Q and was first implemented at Six Flags Over Georgia in 2001. Guests are given handheld devices, which are then used to make reservations and receive notifications when it is their turn to ride. Another iteration is where guests can scan a QR code on in-park signs or through the mobile app, and guests can buy individual Flash Passes per ride or use their season pass or membership Flash Pass. This feature was adopted in 2021.

A water park version of the virtual system called Q-band was first tested at Six Flags White Water in 2011. Guests wear waterproof RFID wristbands that can be scanned at kiosks near participating water park attractions.

See also 
 Incidents at Six Flags parks
 Six Flags Fright Fest
 Holiday in the Park

Notes and references

External links 

 
Amusement park companies
Amusement companies of the United States
Entertainment companies established in 1961
American companies established in 1961
1961 establishments in Texas
Former Time Warner subsidiaries
Companies listed on the New York Stock Exchange
Companies that filed for Chapter 11 bankruptcy in 2009
Companies based in Arlington, Texas
1993 mergers and acquisitions
1998 mergers and acquisitions